Acanthodes (from  , 'provided with spines') is an extinct genus of acanthodian fish. Species have been found in Europe, North America, and Asia, spanning the Early Carboniferous to the Early Permian, making it one of the youngest known acanthodian genera.

Description

Acanthodes grew to lengths of at least . The body was elongate and had a pair of pectoral fins, an unpaired dorsal fin far back on the body, with an unpaired long ventral/pelvic fin and an anal fin on the underside of the body, which like other acanthodians were supported by stiff spines at their front edges. The whole body was covered in scales, which varied in shape depending on their position. The vertebral column was typically unossified. Acanthodes had no teeth and had long gill rakers. Because of this, Acanthodes is presumed to have been a suspension feeder, filtering plankton from the water. A specimen of Acanthodes bridgei was so well-preserved that traces of its eye tissue were sufficient to establish that Acanthodes had both rod and cone photoreceptor cells, suggesting that it was capable of color vision.

Ecology 
The various species of Acanthodes are known to have inhabited freshwater lakes, as well as saline lagoons. Acanthodes bronni, which lived in freshwater lakes in southern Germany during the Early Permian, is known to have been fed upon by the temnospondyl amphibians Archegosaurus and Cheliderpeton. Acanthodes was likely capable of opening its jaws wide as an adaptation to suspension feeding.

Taxonomy 
The classification of acanthodians was historically contentious, however, in the 2010s based in part based on detailed studies of the skull of Acanthodes, it became widely accepted that acanthodians represented a paraphyletic assemblage of stem-group Chondrichthyes. Within the "Acanthodii", Acanthodes is traditionally placed within the Acanthodiformes, which is now also considered to be paraphyletic.

Species 
After Beznosov, 2009

 Acanthodes bronni Agassiz, 1833 (type), Germany, Lower Permian
 Acanthodes bourbonensis Heidtke, 1996, Early Permian, France
 Acanthodes boyi Heidtke, 1993, Early Permian, Germany
 Acanthodes bridgei Zidek, 1976, Late Carboniferous (Stephanian), Kansas, USA
 Acanthodes fritschi Zajic, 1998, Late Carboniferous (Stephanian), Czech Republic
 Acanthodes gracilis (Beyrich, 1848), Early Permian, Czech Republic, Poland and Germany
 Acanthodes kinneyi Zidek, 1992, Late Carboniferous (Stephanian), New Mexico, USA
 Acanthodes lopatini Rohon, 1889, Early Carboniferous (Tournaisian), southern Krasnoyarsk Krai, Russia
 Acanthodes luedersensis (Dalquest et al., 1988), Early Permian of Texas, USA
 Acanthodes lundi Zidek, 1980, Late Carboniferous (Namurian), Montana, USA
 Acanthodes nitidus Woodward, 1891, Early Carboniferous (Visean), Scotland
 Acanthodes ovensi White, 1927, Early Carboniferous (Tournaisian), Scotland
 Acanthodes sippeli Heidtke, 1996, Late Carboniferous (Namurian), Germany
 Acanthodes stambergi Zajic, 2005, Early Permian, Czech Republic 
 Acantodes sulcatus Agassiz, 1835, Early Carboniferous (Visean), Scotland
 Acanthodes tholeyi Heidtke, 1990, Early Permian, Germany
 Acanthodes wardi Egerton, 1866, Late Carboniferous (Westphalian), England and Scotland.

References

 Parker, Steve. Dinosaurus: the complete guide to dinosaurs. Firefly Books Inc, 2003. Pg. 60

External links
entry at the Fossil Museum
entry at Saint Joseph's University

Acanthodii genera
Carboniferous acanthodians
Permian acanthodians
Paleozoic fish of North America
Paleozoic fish of Europe
Prehistoric fish of Australia
Taxa named by Louis Agassiz